Willard Manus (born September 28, 1930, died January 19, 2023) was a Los Angeles-based novelist, playwright, and journalist. His best known book is Mott the Hoople (1966), the novel from which the British 1970s hard rock band derived their name.

Manus was born in New York.  He is the author of This Way to Paradise: Dancing on the Tables, a memoir of life in Lindos, Rhodes, Greece, from the 1960s to the 1990s. Additionally he has had a dozen other books published, most recently a young adult novel, A Dog Called Leka, which deals with a young lad sailing the Aegean islands in the company of an exceptional dog.  More than two dozen of his plays have been produced in Los Angeles, regionally and in Europe.

Member of Los Angeles Film Critics Association since 1981.

Journalism 
Columns
Southern California Correspondent for Playbill On-Line (1995-2000). 
Monthly columnist (theatre, opera, books, movies, jazz & blues) What's Up Magazine &, Lively-Arts.com., Total Theater, The Outlook, Daily News, North-East Newspapers, Pasadena Star News, and many others

Books 

Novels 
Love Under Aegean Skies - Amazon E-Book

Mott the Hoople, McGraw-Hill Co & Pinnacle Books - Amazon E-Book
Fiction
The Fighting Men, Panjandrum Books - Amazon E-Book
The Fixers, Ace Books - E-Book
Connubial Bliss, Panjandrum Books - Amazon E-Book
The Pigskin Rabbi, Breakaway Books - Amazon E-Book
Children's

The Island Kids, Anglo-Hellenic Publishing Co (Picture Book)
Young adult 
The Proud Rebel, Ridge Press/Teenage Book Club 
Sea Treasure, Doubleday 
Mystery of the Flooded Mine, Doubleday 
A Dog Called Leka, Viveca Smith Publishing Co - Amazon E-Book
Non-fiction
This Way to Paradise--Dancing on the Tables, Lycabettus Press

Plays (premiered)
Actual Productions:
Bon Appetit (Los Angeles, 1984, director Bert Rosario)
Diamonds (Los Angeles, 1985, director Richmond Shepard)
Hemingway--On the Edge (Los Angeles, 1993, director Lonny Chapman)
In My Father's House (Los Angeles, 2000, director Jerome Guardino)
Junk Food (Los Angeles, 1981, director Rick Edelstein)
MM at 58 (Los Angeles, 1989, director Gary Guidinger)
The Bleachers
The Deepest Hunger (Los Angeles, 1984, director Lonny Chapman)
The Electronic Lincoln (Los Angeles, 1992, director Susan Deitz)
Their Finest Hour--Churchill and Murrow (Woodstock, director Nicola Sheara)
The Kendo Master (Los Angeles, 1981, director Sab Shimono)
The Last Laugh (Los Angeles, 1999, director John Lant)
The Love Boutique (Los Angeles, 1989, director Walter Olkiewicz)
The Penis Monologues (Los Angeles, 2002, director Louis Fantasia)
The Yard
Man in the Sun
Porkchops
The Call (Los Angeles, 2006, director Gregory Crafts)
Reap the Whirlwind (Los Angeles, 2000, director Doug Lowry)
Walt-Sweet Bird of Freedom (Los Angeles, 1984, director Lonny Chapman)
Central Avenue--The Musical (Los Angeles, 2007, director Louis Fantasia).
"In My Father's House"
"Berlin Cowboys"
"Bird Lives"
"Prez, the Lester Young Story"
Frank & Ava"
Joe & Marilyn, a Love Story"
"The Life and Loves of Marlene Dietrich:
The Wicked, Wicked, Mae West"
and other plays.....

Television 
Boys Will Be Boys, Fox TV.
Secrets of Midland Heights, CBS-TV.
Shannon, CBS-TV.
Too Close For Comfort, ABC-TV.

Translations 
  Leka de hond (A dog called Leka), translated by Gerrit Brand, Uitgeverij Nobelman, 2012.

External links 
 My Name is Leka
 Plays by Willard Manus
 Review 

1930 births
Living people
20th-century American journalists
American male journalists